This is a list of programs currently and soon to be broadcast by Globo News, the news channel of the Brazilian network Globo.

Current programming

Newscasts

News features 
 Cidades e Soluções

Talk shows

Archive programming and specials 
 GloboNews Documentário
 Globo News Especial

Repeats of Rede Globo's shows 
 Fantástico
 Globo Repórter
 Globo Rural
 Conversa com Bial
 Pequenas Empresas & Grandes Negócios

See also 
 List of programs broadcast by Rede Globo

References

External links 
 Globo News website
 Globo News programming

TV Globo
GloboNews
GloboNews